Bijnot Fort, is a ruined fortress located in Bahawalpur District of Punjab, Pakistan,  west of Indo-Pakistani border in Cholistan Desert.

History
It was under the occupation of Rajputs until 18th century.

The fort was destroyed during Indo-Pakistani War of 1971.

See also
 Derawar, another fort in Cholistan

References

Forts in Punjab, Pakistan
Buildings and structures in Bahawalpur District
Tourist attractions in Punjab, Pakistan
Cholistan Desert